Marin Petrov Goleminov (28 September 1908 – 19 February 2000) was a Bulgarian composer, violinist, conductor and pedagogue.

Life and career
Goleminov was born in Kyustendil, Bulgaria; the son of an attorney, he studied law before switching to music. Having studied music at Sofia, Bulgaria, Paris, France, and Munich, Bavaria, Germany, in 1943 he was appointed to the faculty of the Bulgarian State Academy of Music in Sofia to teach orchestration, conducting and composition. From 1954 to 1956 he served as Rector of the Sofia Opera, and as Director of the same organization from 1965 to 1967. In 1976 he was presented with the Gottfried von Herder Award of the Vienna University, and in 1989 was made an Academician of the Bulgarian Academy of Sciences. He died in Espinho, Espinho, Portugal.

Goleminov's compositions draw heavily on the traditional rhythms and melodic patterns of Bulgarian folk music, while also exploring more modernist classical trends. His son Michail was also a composer.

Honours
Goleminov Point in Antarctica is named after Marin Goleminov.

References
 Don Michael Randel, The Harvard Biographical Dictionary of Music, p. 320-21. Harvard University Press, 1996,

Further reading

External links
 Marin Goleminov at the Union of Bulgarian Composers
 UNESCO biography

People from Kyustendil
Bulgarian classical composers
Ballet composers
20th-century classical composers
1908 births
2000 deaths
Bulgarian conductors (music)
Bulgarian violinists
20th-century violinists
Male classical composers
Herder Prize recipients
20th-century conductors (music)
20th-century male musicians